The 155th Separate Guards Marine Brigade is a brigade-sized formation of the Russian Naval Infantry.  It is located in the city of Vladivostok and the village of Slovianka, Primorsky Krai.  It is part of the Pacific Fleet.

In 2022, the brigade took part in a full-scale Russian invasion of Ukraine, where it fought near Kyiv.

History 
The 155th Separate Naval Infantry Brigade was created on December 1, 2009, by reorganizing the 55th Naval Infantry Division, which was created in 1968.

War in Chechnya 
The 155th Separate Marine Brigade performed combat missions in Chechnya during the First Russian-Chechen War.  First, the 165th Marine Regiment was sent, followed by the consolidated 106th Marine Regiment, which operated in the foothills and mountainous regions of Chechnya.  More than 2,400 servicemen were awarded orders and medals, 63 infantrymen died in battle, and five of them became a Hero of the Russian Federation.

During the Russian intervention in Syria, the 155th brigade provided support and cover to the PKS aviation group as part of the Permanent Operational Unit of the Russian Navy.

2022 Russian Invasion of Ukraine 
Starting in 2022, the brigade took part in the Russian invasion of Ukraine.

On March 13, journalist Roman Tsimbalyuk reported on the brigade's significant losses in the battles: "about 600 servicemen killed and the same number wounded".

On March 19, the General Staff of the Armed Forces of Ukraine reported that separate units of the 155th Separate Naval Infantry Brigade and the 40th Naval Infantry Brigade (Petropavlovsk-Kamchatsky) were transferred to the territory of Belarus to replace the losses of the Eastern Military District.

On March 28, President Putin assigned the brigade the rank of guards, at the same time as the 126th Coastal Defense Brigade.

On April 3–4, 2022, units of the Russian Armed Forces that committed war crimes during the occupation of settlements near Kyiv. The 155th brigade occupied the area of the town of Ivankiv — the village of Rozvazhiv in the Vyshgorod district of the Kyiv region.

In early November 2022, there were reports of heavy losses in the brigade in battles in the Pavlivka area near Vuhledar in the Donetsk region.  The servicemen of the brigade and Russian propagandists wrote an open letter, addressing Putin, in which they claimed that in four days they had lost "about 300 people killed, wounded and missing" due to the fault of the command - General Muradov and Akhmedov - and asked to send an independent commission, not associated with the Ministry of Defense of the Russian Federation.

In early February 2023, the 155th brigade again suffered heavy losses during the offensive on Vuhledar.  Video recordings of one combat encounter show about 30 destroyed Russian combat vehicles:  13 destroyed tanks and 12 BMPs are about half of the Russian tank battalion.  Ossetian military correspondents tried to place the blame for tactical failures on the higher command, in particular again on General Muradov. However, the footage shows Russian forces engaged in ineffective operations, showing that the 155th Brigade appears to be made up of freshly mobilized soldiers who are poorly trained.

Composition

2019 

 59th separate marine infantry battalion (Slovyanka village);
 47th Separate Assault Battalion;
 287th separate self-propelled artillery division (Slovyanka village);
 288th Anti-Aircraft Missile Artillery Division;

Losses 
It is known about the loss of 74 people in the 155th Separate Marine Brigade who were killed during the invasion of Ukraine as of September 2022.

References 

Naval infantry brigades of Russia
Military units and formations established in 2009